Pradip Kumar Amat (born 18 October 1952) is the former finance minister of Odisha, India.

He had studied LLB, M.A. and was an advocate by profession.

He was elected as MLA from Boudh at Odisha Assembly. during 2000–2004, 2004–2009, 2009–2014 and 2014–2019, 2019 incumbent.  He was inducted into Naveen Patnaik's Cabinet as Forest & Environment, Panchayati Raj & Drinking Water, Information & Public Relations Minister in June 2022.

References

1952 births
Speakers of the Odisha Legislative Assembly
People from Boudh district
Living people
Odisha MLAs 2000–2004
Odisha MLAs 2004–2009
Odisha MLAs 2009–2014
Odisha MLAs 2014–2019
Odisha MLAs 2019–2024
Biju Janata Dal politicians